Diego Matías Passarelli (born 2 August 1984 in  Argentina) is an Argentinian Footballer who currently plays for Alianza F.C.

Club career
In 2012, he joined Alianza F.C. of El Salvador.

External links
 elsalvadorfc.com 
 matiaspasarelli.blogspot.com.au
 Diego Passarelli at BDFA.com.ar 

1981 births
Living people
Argentine footballers
Association football midfielders
Argentine expatriate footballers
Expatriate footballers in El Salvador
Alianza F.C. footballers
Footballers from Buenos Aires